The Useless Web was an example of early web humor.

Criteria
It was a list of links to web pages the writers deemed egregiously useless, with humorous descriptions. In time it grew to a directory with links archived by category. It helped disseminate many early minor internet memes and phenomenon. There were many imitators, and it spawned its own Yahoo category. Marc Andreessen once called it "One of the best sites on the Web".

Origins
The site was founded by Paul Phillips in 1994. Steve Berlin took over in 1995 and started to update more regularly. In 1999 John Gephart IV took over and continued to update the site until early 2001.

Reception
The Useless Web received media coverage in The New York Times and Wired magazine.

Similar websites
A similar website, The Useless Web, was launched in 2012.

See also
Mirsky's Worst of the Web

References

External links
Copy of the site from the Internet Archive

American comedy websites
Internet memes
Defunct American websites
Internet properties established in 1994
Internet properties disestablished in 2001
1994 establishments in the United States